Fernando Manuel Seixas Pereira (born 27 June 1968) is a Portuguese football manager and a former player. He is the manager of Anadia.

Club career
He made his Primeira Liga debut for Chaves on 21 May 1989 in a game against Fafe.

Honours
Beira-Mar
Taça de Portugal: 1998–99

References

External links
 

1968 births
People from Vila Real, Portugal
Living people
Portuguese footballers
G.D. Chaves players
Primeira Liga players
AD Fafe players
F.C. Penafiel players
Liga Portugal 2 players
F.C. Paços de Ferreira players
Leça F.C. players
F.C. Maia players
Portuguese football managers
Association football midfielders
Sportspeople from Vila Real District